SADM may refer to:
Special Atomic Demolition Munition
Morón Airport and Air Base, ICAO code: SADM